New Boston is an unincorporated community in Huff Township, Spencer County, in the U.S. state of Indiana.

History
New Boston was laid out in 1851. The community most likely took its name from the larger city of Boston, Massachusetts.

A post office was established at New Boston in 1852, and remained in operation until it was discontinued in 1868.

Geography

References

Unincorporated communities in Spencer County, Indiana
Unincorporated communities in Indiana